Hugh II of Ponthieu was count of Ponthieu and lord of Abbeville, the son of Enguerrand I of Ponthieu. Evidently, Hugh II was the half-brother of Guy, who became the bishop of Amiens; Fulk, who became the abbot of Forest l'Abbaye; and Robert. However, it is possible that both Robert and Hugh II were the sons of Enguerrand's first wife, and Guy and Fulk the sons of a later wife that Enguerrand I married when he was in his forties.

Hugh II was married to Bertha of Aumale, Countess of Aumale. They had: 
Enguerrand II who succeeded Hugh II as Count of Ponthieu
Robert
Hugh
Waleran
Beatrice of Ponthieu (1022–1054) was married to William of Talou, the count of Arques
Guy I (possibly), succeeded Enguerrand II as Count of Ponthieu

Notes

References

Sources

Further reading 
The Carmen de Hastingae Proelio of Bishop Guy of Amiens, edited by Catherine Morton and Hope Muntz, Oxford at the Clarendon Press, 1972.
Medieval Lands Project on Hugh II, Count of Ponthieu

Ponthieu, Hugh II of
Counts of Ponthieu
Year of birth unknown
11th-century French people